Douglas Rivers is an American political scientist. He is Professor of Political Science at Stanford University and Senior Fellow at the Hoover Institution. He also served as the president and CEO of YouGov/Polimetrix and is currently the global polling firm's chief scientist.

Biography 
Rivers received his B.A. from Columbia University in 1977 and Ph.D. from Harvard University in 1981. Before joining the Stanford faculty in 1989, he taught at Harvard University, Caltech, and University of California, Los Angeles.

In 1996, Rivers founded Preview Systems, a publicly trading maker of software for distributing and licensing music and software over the Internet.

He co-founded Knowledge Networks in 1998 to provide public opinion survey tools and access to very large and cost-effective panels to conduct survey experiments through the WebTV box, yielding an overall response rate that is higher than most polling firms. His company was contracted by CBS, NBC and USA Today to carry out surveys. He was named "executive of the year by the Research Business Report in 2000.

He founded the firm Polimetrix, which was acquired by YouGov in 2007, and has led the company's American business until 2011, when he was named chief scientist of YouGov.

Rivers was elected a fellow of the American Academy of Arts and Sciences in 2015. He is also a director of the Roper Center for Public Opinion Research and YouGov.

References 

Living people
Year of birth missing (living people)
American political scientists

Pollsters
Hoover Institution people
Stanford University faculty
Harvard University faculty
California Institute of Technology faculty
University of California, Los Angeles faculty
Columbia College (New York) alumni
Harvard University alumni
Fellows of the American Academy of Arts and Sciences